Events from the year 2008 in Romania.

Incumbents
President: Traian Băsescu
Prime Minister: Călin Popescu-Tăriceanu (until 22 December); Emil Boc (from 22 December)

Events 
April 2 – A NATO summit takes place at the Palace of the Parliament, Bucharest.
June 1 – 2008 Romanian local elections, with a runoff for mayors on June 15.
November 15 – Petrila Mine disaster: Twelve miners die after two explosions at a mine in Petrila, one of six coal mining cities in the Jiu Valley region of Hunedoara County.
November 24 – Another miner dies at Floreasca Hospital in Bucharest, raising the death toll from the Petrila Mine disaster to 13.
November 30 – 2008 Romanian legislative election.

Deaths

January 3 – Petru Dugulescu, pastor, politician (born 1945)
January 22 – Ștefan Niculescu, composer (born 1927)
August 16 – Elena Leușteanu, Olympic gymnast (born 1935)
September 7 – Ilarion Ciobanu, actor (born 1931)
September 14 – Ștefan Iordache, actor (born 1941)
October 8 – George Emil Palade, cell biologist, Nobel Prize laureate (born 1912)

See also

List of Romanian films of 2008
2008 in the European Union
2008 in Europe
Romania in the Eurovision Song Contest 2008
Romania at the 2008 Summer Olympics
Romania at the 2008 Summer Paralympics

References

External links

 
Years of the 21st century in Romania
Romania
2000s in Romania
Romania